Dancis is a surname. Notable people with the name include:

George Dancis (1931–2021), Australian basketball player,  participant in the 1956 Summer Olympics
Joseph Dancis (1916–2010), American pediatrician
Mike Dancis (1939–2020), Australian basketball player, participant in the 1964 Summer Olympics